Boris Markovich Kogan (February 8, 1940 – December 25, 1993) was a Russian-born American chess master.

Kogan was the Soviet Junior Champion in 1956 and 1957. He was a full-time chess teacher in the Soviet Union before emigrating and coming to the United States in 1980. In 1981 he was also awarded the International Master title.

He played in the U.S. Chess Championship three times. He was Georgia state champion seven years in a row (1980–1986) and won it a total of nine times (additional wins in 1988 and 1992). He died of colon cancer in 1993.

References

External links
 

1940 births
1993 deaths
American chess players
American people of Russian-Jewish descent
Deaths from cancer in Georgia (U.S. state)
Chess International Masters
Deaths from colorectal cancer
Jewish chess players
Soviet chess players
Soviet emigrants to the United States
Soviet Jews
20th-century chess players